Y Island is a small island located in the Exmouth Gulf of Western Australia. The area is a popular one for Kayak fishing.

References

Islands of the Pilbara